The Hit Music Network was a collection of five Independent Local Radio stations operating in the United Kingdom and owned by Global Radio. Created on 25 June 2008, the stations were formerly owned by GCap Media prior to its takeover by Global and, with the exception of 95.8 Capital FM, were all part of The One Network. Initially the network included Trent FM, Ram FM, Leicester Sound, Mercia FM, and Beacon Radio Wolverhampton until the latter two we removed as they were part of the disposal by Global Radio after the GCap Media purchase and purchased by Orion Media. Mercury FM Crawley, Ten 17 in Harlow and Hertfordshire's Mercury 96.6 joined the Hit Music Network at that point, until 26 July 2010. Red Dragon FM in South Wales, whilst part of the Hit Music Network, remained local 24 hours a day taking none of the network programmes (except the Big Top 40).

Its core audience was 18- to 34-year-olds.

Networked programming originated from Trent FM's studios in Chapel Quarter, Nottingham under Programme Director Dick Stone.

The network was rebranded and merged with The Galaxy Network in January 2011 to form 'The Capital FM Network', comprising eight stations in London, Scotland, South East Wales, the West & East Midlands and northern & southern England broadcasting under the Capital FM identity. Local programming on the stations is restricted to daily breakfast and weekday drivetime shows (alongside some local specialist output) with Trent FM, Leicester Sound and Ram FM merged to form Capital FM East Midlands from Nottingham.

History

The One Network was formed following the merger of GWR Group and Capital Radio in 2005, merging GWR's Mix Network with Capital's Capital FM Network and was relaunched in September 2007.

In 2008, Global Radio acquired GCap and announced plans to break up the One Network, with most stations being rebranded as Heart, one becoming a Galaxy station and the remaining others retaining their 'heritage' brand as a new network (mainly as the stations overlapped with existing Heart stations).

On Air
A schedule containing network shows - from Trent FM's studios in Nottingham - and local shows at various times was set for The Hit Music Network, but did not operate on 95.8 Capital FM in London or Red Dragon FM in South East Wales. The Big Top 40 Show was broadcast throughout the whole of the Hit Music Network.

The Hit Music Network was renowned for its high rotation of songs and tight presentation. The presenters often ensured the most songs possible were played in an hour. This was a direct contrast to the BBCs CHR station Radio 1, where the presenters stop music and have longer 'personality' links, as opposed to the speedlinks of the Hit Music Network. Unlike Radio 1, the network did not play alternative, rock or classic hits music.

Capital Network

On Monday 3 January 2011, all Hit Music Network & Galaxy Network stations were rebranded as "Capital FM", forming a new Capital FM Network. All programming with the exception of breakfast, drivetime, weekend afternoon and some local specialist output originates from 95.8 Capital FM London.

Stations rebranded:
 103.2 & 97.4 Red Dragon FM - 97.4/103.2 Capital FM "South Wales' No.1 Hit Music Station"
 Leicester Sound, Ram FM and Trent FM - 96-106 Capital FM "East Midlands' No.1 Hit Music Station"
 Galaxy Birmingham - 102.2 Capital FM "Birmingham's No.1 Hit Music Station"
 Galaxy Manchester - 102 Capital FM "Manchester's No.1 Hit Music Station"
 Galaxy North East - 105-106 Capital FM "North East's No.1 Hit Music Station"
 Galaxy Scotland - 105-106 Capital FM "Scotland's No.1 Hit Music Station"
 Galaxy South Coast - 103.2 Capital FM "South Coast's No.1 Hit Music Station"
 Galaxy Yorkshire - 105 Capital FM "Yorkshire's No.1 Hit Music Station"

Stations
 95.8 Capital FM (London)
 Leicester Sound (Leicester)
 Red Dragon FM (South East Wales)
 Ram FM (Derby)
 Trent FM (Nottingham)
 Ten 17 (Harlow, East Hertfordshire & West Essex) - until Monday 26 July 2010
 Hertfordshire's Mercury 96.6 (Watford and South Hertfordshire) - until Monday 26 July 2010
 Mercury FM (East Surrey & North Sussex) - until Monday 26 July 2010
 Mercia FM (Coventry) - until 2009
 Beacon Radio (Wolverhampton) - until 2009

Ten 17 and Mercury FM were merged with Heart stations in Essex and Sussex & Surrey and the independently owned Mercury 96.6 was rebranded as Heart Hertfordshire.

See also
 Global Radio

References

External links
 thisisglobal.com

 
Former British radio networks
Contemporary hit radio stations in the United Kingdom